Kim Joo-hyun (born March 10, 1987) is a South Korean actress. Kim debuted in the film Epitaph in 2007. She is known for resembling Han Ga-in.

Filmography

Film

Television series

References

External links 
 
 
 

1987 births
Living people
21st-century South Korean actresses
South Korean film actresses
South Korean television actresses
Dongguk University alumni
People from Gyeonggi Province